Dellamora gracilicauda is a species of beetle in the family Mordellidae. It was discovered in 1922.

References

Mordellidae
Beetles described in 1922